James Carl Dale (born December 7, 1972) is an American former Major League Baseball (MLB) pitcher who played for the Milwaukee Brewers in 1999.

Amateur career
A native of Indianapolis, Indiana, Dale attended Cookeville High School and Winthrop University. In 1993, he played collegiate summer baseball in the Cape Cod Baseball League for the Yarmouth-Dennis Red Sox. He was selected by the St. Louis Cardinals in the second round of the 1994 MLB Draft.

Professional career
Dale was traded by the Cardinals to the Oakland Athletics in 1996, and traded from the Athletics to the Milwaukee Brewers in 1999. He made his major league debut with the Brewers in 1999, appearing in four games in September of that season.

References

External links

1972 births
Living people
Akron Aeros players
American expatriate baseball players in Canada
Baseball players from Indianapolis
Buffalo Bisons (minor league) players
Edmonton Trappers players
Huntsville Stars players
Louisville Bats players
Louisville RiverBats players
Major League Baseball pitchers
Milwaukee Brewers players
Modesto A's players
New Jersey Cardinals players
Peoria Chiefs players
Trenton Thunder players
Vancouver Canadians players
Winthrop Eagles baseball players
Yarmouth–Dennis Red Sox players